Gartman is a surname of German origin. Notable people with the surname include:

Earl Gartman (c.1920–1995), American football, baseball, and basketball coach and college athletics administrator
Maria Gartman (1818–1885), Dutch actress

See also
Gartmann

German-language surnames
Germanic-language surnames
Surnames of German origin